Kazutaka (written: 一貴, 一宇, 一孝, 和隆 or 教隆) is a masculine Japanese given name. Notable people with the name include:

Kazutaka Kogi (born 1933), Japanese academic
, Japanese ultra-nationalist and murderer
, Japanese mechanical designer
, Japanese footballer
, Japanese sumo wrestler
, Japanese baseball player

See also
8087 Kazutaka, a main-belt asteroid

Japanese masculine given names